Gevgelija railway station (Железничка Станица Гевгелија) is the main railway station in Gevgelija, North Macedonia. It is located outside the city and is served by international intercity trains to Thessaloniki, Skopje, and Belgrade.

History
The station was built in 1873 when Chemins de fer Orientaux opened the line from Skopje to Thessaloniki, both at the time part of Ottoman Empire. Following the Treaty of London that ended the First Balkan War on 30 May 1913, Gevgelija was annexed then incorporated into the Kingdom of Serbia, as one of the kingdoms southernmost settlements, and Gevgelija was integrated into the Serbian railways. In 1929 the railways along with the country were renamed, now known as Yugoslav State Railways (JDŽ). In April 1941 the railway ceased to exist when Yougoslvia was annexed by the Axis powers. Despite having joined the Axis Powers, the Bulgarian military did not participate in the invasion of Yugoslavia, however, were ready to occupy their pre-arranged territorial gains immediately after the capitulation of the country. The Yugoslav government surrendered on 17 April; on 19 April, the Bulgarian Land Forces entered Yugoslavia. After Yugoslavia's capitulation, Bulgaria occupied most of Yugoslav Macedonia, which had been lost to Bulgaria in 1918. The railways in these regions were incorporated into the Bulgarian State Railways and repurposed to serve the war effect. Following Bulgaria's surrender, Gevgelija was returned to Yugoslavia. The railway was reestablished after World War II. In 1952 it was renamed Yugoslav Railways. In September 1991, an independence referendum was held in then Socialist Republic of Macedonia, which afterwards proclaimed independence from SFR Yugoslavia to become Republic of Macedonia. With that, Gevgelija and all rail infrastructure and assets were transferred from Yugoslav Railways to Makedonski Železnici MŽ. In 2020, the station was one of ten regional stations to be allocated funds for renovation work. The waiting room, the ticket office, the toilets, and the other rooms within the station building were renovated, with the facade of the building being declared a cultural monument is being repaired and renovated.

Facilities
The station has a ticket office, toilets and cafe. at the first/last station for services to/from Greece station has a border and customs post. At platform level, the station is equipped with departure and arrival screens on the platforms for passenger information, seating, and information boards. Currently, no buses call at the station. There is however onsite parking available at the station. The station can be contacted during opening hours by phone +389 (0) 34 / 212-033, local: 309

Services
The station is serviced by a number of local, long-distance, and international services. In April 2021 new timetables were announced, with trains leaving Gevgelija for Skopje 05:30 and at 16:00

Migrant Crisiss 
12 April 2018 at 18.05 a mixed patrol team of customs officers and a representative of the Macedonian Railways Gevgelija regional unit performed a control inspection of two wagons of a freight train that had arrived from Greece. There they reported Four migrants from Afghanistan and Iran caught hiding aboard the train.

References

Railway stations in North Macedonia
Buildings and structures in Kumanovo